Robert A. Houze, Jr., is an American atmospheric scientist, researcher, author, and Professor Emeritus of Atmospheric Sciences at the University of Washington where he led a research team known as the Mesoscale Group for 46 years. He and his group participated in international field projects around the world and global satellite programs employing weather radar and aircraft in the tropics and midlatitudes, in projects sponsored by NSF, NASA, DOE, and NOAA. Houze has been on the science teams for three NASA satellites for the global study of clouds and precipitation. The predominant areas of his research are tropical convective clouds, extreme storms, flooding in the Asian Monsoon, tropical cyclones, and midlatitude frontal systems in mountainous regions.

Houze has published over 200 research articles and has authored a comprehensive book on the physics and dynamics of all types of clouds in the atmosphere entitled Cloud Dynamics. In 2017, the Robert A. Houze Jr. Symposium was organized to honor him at the American Meteorological Society's Annual Meeting.

Education and career 
Born in Texas in 1945, Houze grew up in College Station, near Texas A&M University, where he received a B.S. in Meteorology in 1967. He then attended the Massachusetts Institute of Technology (MIT), from which he received an M.S. in Meteorology in 1969, followed by a Ph.D. in Meteorology in 1972. At MIT, his mentor was Pauline Austin, a pioneer of using radar to study weather. After completing his Ph.D., Houze joined the University of Washington as an Assistant Professor in 1972 and rose to the level of full Professor in 1983. In 1988-89, he taught at the Swiss Federal Institute of Technology in Zurich as a Guest Professor. At the University of Washington, he has mentored 24 Ph.D.’s.

Houze is a Fellow of the American Meteorological Society, and in 2006, he was awarded the Society’s highest research award, the Carl-Gustaf Rossby Research Medal. He is a Fellow of the American Geophysical Union, and in 2012 he delivered the Union’s Bjerknes Lecture. In 2013, he became a Fellow of the American Association for the Advancement of Science. He is a Fellow of the Royal Meteorological Society, and in 2014 he received that Society’s highest research award, the Symons Gold Medal.

During 2015-2018 Houze was designated as a Laboratory Fellow at the Pacific Northwest National Laboratory.

In 2017, the Robert A. Houze Jr. Symposium was organized to honor him at the American Meteorological Society's Annual Meeting.

Research and work 
When he arrived at the University of Washington in 1972, Houze began developing what became known as his Mesoscale Group. With this group, he conducted research for over 46 years. In the early years, he participated in the Global Atmospheric Research Programme’s Atlantic Tropical Experiment (GATE)—the largest field campaign ever to study weather. In GATE, he was on board a ship instrumented with radar, and was one of the first to use radar to document a tropical squall line. Soon after GATE, he joined the international Monsoon Experiment (MONEX), in which he conducted radar studies on clouds in the winter monsoon in Malaysia in 1978-79. The MONEX study was one of the first field campaigns to collect airborne radar data.

Since these projects he has conducted radar studies over all the major oceans and over mountain ranges in Europe and North America. The GATE experience launched a career of using radar on ships, islands and aircraft in field campaigns around the world—in northern Australia, Malaysia, India, Africa, the Italian Alps, the Solomon Islands, the Maldives, and various locations in the U.S.—especially to study fronts passing over the Cascade and Olympic Mountains, to fly into hurricanes over the Gulf, Atlantic, and Pacific, and to study thunderstorms over Kansas. In 2015, he led OLYMPEX in which numerous state-of-the-art radars were used to study how frontal storms moving from the Pacific Ocean over the Olympic Mountains produce enormous rainfall in the rain forests of northwestern North America.

Awards and honors 
1982 - Editor’s Award, American Meteorological Society
1982 - Clarence Leroy Meisinger Award, American Meteorological Society
1983 - Fellow of the American Meteorological Society
2001 - Highly Cited Researcher, Institute of Scientific Information
2006 - Carl-Gustaf Rossby Research Medal, American Meteorological Society
2012 - Fellow of the American Geophysical Union 
2012 - Bjerknes Lecture, American Geophysical Union
2013 - Fellow of the American Association for the Advancement of Science 
2014 - Symons Gold Medal of the Royal Meteorological Society
2014 - Fellow of the Royal Meteorological Society

Publications

Books 
Cloud Dynamics (1993)
A Half Century of Progress in Meteorology: A Tribute to Richard Reed (2003)
Cloud Dynamics 2nd Edition (2014)

Selected papers 
Structure and dynamics of a tropical squall-line system. Monthly Weather Review (1977)
Convection in GATE. Reviews of Geophysics (1981)
Cloud clusters and large-scale vertical motions in the tropics. Journal of the Meteorological Society of Japan (1982)
Observed structure of mesoscale convective systems and implications for large‐scale heating. Quarterly Journal of the Royal Meteorological Society (1989)
Mesoscale organization of springtime rainstorms in Oklahoma. Monthly Weather Review (1990)
Stratiform precipitation in regions of convection: A meteorological paradox? Bulletin of the American Meteorological Society (1997)
Stratiform rain in the tropics as seen by the TRMM precipitation radar. Journal of Climate (2003)
Mesoscale convective systems. Reviews of Geophysics (2004)
Clouds in tropical cyclones. Monthly Weather Review (2010)
Anomalous atmospheric events leading to the Summer 2010 floods in Pakistan. Bulletin of the American Meteorological Society 
Orographic effects on precipitating clouds. Reviews of Geophysics (2012)
The variable nature of convection in the tropics and subtropics: A legacy of 16 years of the Tropical Rainfall Measuring Mission (TRMM) satellite. Reviews of Geophysics (2015)
The Olympic Mountains Experiment (OLYMPEX). Bulletin of the American Meteorological Society (2017)
100 Years of Research on Mesoscale Convective Systems. Meteorological Monographs (2018)

References 

American atmospheric scientists
University of Washington faculty
Texas A&M University alumni
Massachusetts Institute of Technology School of Science alumni
1945 births
Living people
Fellows of the American Meteorological Society